Christopher Bancroft Burnham (born 1956) is and American business executive, public servant, and politician. He is the chairman and chief executive officer of Cambridge Global Capital, LLC and chairman of the board of EN+ Group. He has served as Under Secretary General for Management of the United Nations, Assistant Secretary of State for Resource Management and chief financial officer of the U.S. Department of State. He was a three-term Member of the Connecticut House of Representatives, Connecticut State Treasurer as well as vice chairman of Deutsche Bank Asset Management and global co-head of private equity.

Early life and education
Burnham was raised in Stamford, Connecticut. His father, Alexander O. Burnham, was the managing editor of Dodd, Mead & Company and an author.

Burnham earned an undergraduate degree from Washington and Lee University and a master's degree in public administration from Harvard Kennedy School.

Career
Burnham is a veteran of the United States Marine Corps and a veteran of the first Gulf War. He led one of the first infantry units to reach and liberate Kuwait City in 1991. From 1987 to 1992 he was a representative in the Connecticut General Assembly.

Burnham was elected Connecticut State Treasurer in 1994, defeating the Democratic incumbent Joseph M. Suggs Jr. Burnham resigned effective July 22, 1997, to become president and chief executive officer of Columbus Circle Investors, an investment firm based in Stamford, Connecticut. Because Burnham had previously hired the firm to manage $150 million of the state's pension funds, his decision to join the company came under criticism.

Burnham was an investment banker with Credit Suisse First Boston and Advest Corporate Finance. He was elected to the Connecticut House of Representatives three times, and served as assistant minority leader.

In 2020, Burnham was nominated by President Donald Trump to be the member of the Federal Retirement Thrift Investment Board (FRTIB).

United Nations 
Burnham joined the United Nations in 2005 after serving as acting Under Secretary of State for Management for Secretary Condoleezza Rice, and as Assistant Secretary of State for resource management and chief financial officer of the State Department for General Colin Powell. He established the first UN Ethics Office, the first United Nations Independent Audit Advisory Committee, the adoption of new International Public Sector Accounting Standards, the first comprehensive consolidated annual report in the history of the United Nations, and a new whistleblower protection policy that received independent recognition as the “gold standard.”

During his time as under secretary general for management at the UN, Burnham uncovered extensive evidence of fraud involving the purchase of equipment for peacekeeping operations amounting to tens of millions of dollars. The investigation led to the suspension with pay of eight officials from the offices of peacekeeping and management.

Personal 
Burnham married Courtney Anne Bauer in 1993.

Burnham was a resident of Stamford and Greenwich, Connecticut. He served on President Donald Trump's transition team at the U.S. State Department in 2016.

References

|-

|-

|-

|-

1956 births
Living people
American chief executives of financial services companies
American chief operating officers
United States Marine Corps personnel of the Gulf War
Businesspeople from New York City
Harvard Kennedy School alumni
Kent School alumni
Republican Party members of the Connecticut House of Representatives
Military personnel from New York City
People from Stamford, Connecticut
State treasurers of Connecticut
United States foreign policy
United States Marine Corps reservists
Washington and Lee University alumni
20th-century American businesspeople
United States Marine Corps colonels